Highway 1 is a provincial highway in British Columbia, Canada, that carries the main route of the Trans-Canada Highway (TCH). It is the westernmost portion of the main TCH to be numbered "Highway 1", which continues through Western Canada and extends to the Manitoba–Ontario boundary. The section of Highway 1 in the Lower Mainland is the second-busiest freeway in Canada, after Ontario Highway 401 in Toronto.

The highway's western terminus is in the provincial capital of Victoria, where it serves as a city street and freeway in the suburbs. Highway 1 travels north to Nanaimo and reaches the Lower Mainland at Horseshoe Bay via a BC Ferries route across the Strait of Georgia. The highway bypasses Vancouver on a freeway that travels through Burnaby, northern Surrey, and Abbotsford while following the Fraser River inland. The freeway ends in Hope, where Highway 1 turns north and later east to follow the Fraser and Thompson rivers into the Interior and through Kamloops. The highway continues east across the Columbia Mountains, serving three national parks: Mount Revelstoke, Glacier, and Yoho. Highway 1 enters Alberta at Kicking Horse Pass near Banff National Park.

Highway 1 was preceded by several overland trails and wagon roads established in the mid-to-late 19th century, including the Old Yale Road in the Fraser Valley, the Cariboo Road, and the Big Bend Highway. The provincial government designated Highway 1 in 1941 on a portion of the Island Highway between Victoria and Kelsey Bay as well as the Vancouver–Banff highway. It was incorporated into the national Trans-Canada Highway program, which was established in 1949 and completed in 1962. Other sections of the highway were realigned in later years, including a new freeway in the Lower Mainland that opened in the 1960s and 1970s and was numbered Highway 401.

Vancouver Island section

The western terminus of Highway 1 and the  main route of the Trans-Canada Highway is at Dallas Road on the southern coast of Victoria, which faces the Strait of Juan de Fuca. The terminus is marked by the Mile Zero Monument, a wooden sign at the foot of Beacon Hill Park, with a nearby statue of runner Terry Fox to commemorate his cross-country marathon that was planned to end at the monument. The highway travels north on Douglas Street and forms the boundary between the residential James Bay neighbourhood to the west and Beacon Hill Park to the east. At the northwest edge of the park, Blanshard Street from the street to run a block east, staying parallel to Douglas Street.

The highway travels through Downtown Victoria and passes several city landmarks, including the Fairmont Empress Hotel, the Bay Centre, Chinatown, and Save-On-Foods Memorial Centre. It follows Douglas Street, a six-lane urban thoroughfare with bus lanes during peak periods, and continues north into the suburban municipality of Saanich. Near the Uptown shopping centre, Highway 1 turns west and becomes a limited-access road that travels alongside the Galloping Goose Regional Trail through residential areas and along the north side of Portage Inlet. The highway becomes a full freeway with four-to-six lanes as it enters the town of View Royal and travels around the north side of Mill Hill Regional Park. It then intersects Highway 14 in Langford and reverts to a limited-access road with a median divider. Highway 1 (part of the Island Highway) then travels around Bear Mountain and turns north to follow the Goldstream River into Goldstream Provincial Park, where it meets several trailheads.

The Island Highway continues along the west side of the Saanich Inlet and enters the Cowichan Valley Regional District near Malahat. The section also has occasional closures with no road detour, relying on the limited-capacity Mill Bay Ferry as the sole remaining connection between Greater Victoria and other Vancouver Island communities. Highway 1 passes the Malahat SkyWalk, an observation built by the Malahat First Nation, and through farmland surrounding Mill Bay. The highway travels around central Duncan and through Ladysmith as it continues north as a divided highway with limited access at signalized intersections. In southern Nanaimo, it has a short concurrency with Highway 19, which continues east to the Duke Point ferry terminal and northwest along the Strait of Georgia. Highway 1 travels through central Nanaimo on Nicol Street and Stewart Avenue to the Departure Bay ferry terminal, where the Vancouver Island section ends. BC Ferries operates an automobile ferry service from Departure Bay to Horseshoe Bay that carries Highway 1 to the Lower Mainland region of British Columbia. A typical vessel assigned to the route can carry 1,460 to 1,571 passengers and 310 to 322 vehicles.

History

The Vancouver Island section of Highway 1 was designated in the initial numbering scheme announced by the provincial government in March 1940, along with Highway 1A. It originally connected Victoria to Kelsey Bay, a small coastal community north of Campbell River. The Vancouver Island section was truncated to downtown Nanaimo in 1953, with the section north of Nanaimo being re-numbered to Highway 19. When BC Ferries took over the ferry route between Departure Bay in Nanaimo and Horseshoe Bay in West Vancouver in 1961, Highway 1 was extended to the Departure Bay ferry dock.

The Malahat Highway was completed in 1911 as a gravel road with a single lane and was later upgraded to two paved lanes. A bridge across the Finlayson Arm to bypass the section was among 19 options studied in 2007, but were discarded in favor of other solutions that would cost less. In 2019, the provincial government studied the construction of a permanent detour for the Goldstream–Malahat section of Highway 1 and identified several potential routes, but instead decided to move forward with safety improvements to the existing highway. The section was severely damaged by several floods in November 2021, which closed the road for several days and required $15 million in repairs the following year.

Lower Mainland section

Route details
Sections of Highway 1 from Grandview Highway in Vancouver to 216 Street in Langley vary from being 3 to 4 lanes in each direction and shortens to two lanes after leaving Langley (Metro Vancouver) and enters Abbotsford (Fraser Valley). With one of these lanes being a high-occupancy vehicle (HOV) lane. These HOV lanes were constructed in 1998 as part of the BC MOT's "Go Green" project to promote the use of HOV vehicles, and cost $62 million.

History

North Shore
The Upper Levels Highway opened between Horseshoe Bay and Taylor Way in West Vancouver on September 14, 1957, replacing a section of Marine Drive that had carried Highway 1. Construction on a new, high-level Second Narrows Bridge began two months later and was planned to be incorporated into the Trans-Canada Highway upon completion. On June 17, 1958, several spans of the unfinished bridge collapsed during work on the main arch; 18 workers died and one diver also died during a later search at the site. The Second Narrows Bridge was dedicated to the accident's victims and opened to traffic on August 25, 1960; it cost $23 million to construct and was the second-longest bridge in Canada at the time of its completion.

Vancouver to Chilliwack
Prior to the opening of the freeway (and prior to the 1980s and 1990s, expressway) segments of the present Trans-Canada, traffic used the Pattullo Bridge, Kingsway, and Fraser Highway as the Trans-Canada Highway. These roads were a part of the Highway 1 from its designation in 1940  until the redesignation of the B.C.'s 400 series highways in 1972/73.

By 1932 a new cutoff across northern parts of the drained Sumas Lake was mostly built. The cutoff bypassed the Yale Road which avoided the historical lake by running on its southern flank and along the base of Vedder Mountain. The highway was initially partly gravel, but it was fully paved within a few years of its opening.

From 1960 to 1964, the province opened several expressway and freeway segments as a part of a continuous express route between Bridal Falls and Taylor Way in West Vancouver.

On August 1, 1960, the Chilliwack Bypass  was officially opened by Highways Minister Phil Gaglardi, MLA for Chillwack William Kenneth Kiernan and a six-year-old girl who cut the blue ribbon. About  of the road had been opened before Gaglardi officially opened the bypass. Work on the bypass started on December 12, 1956, with two men clearing bushes.

Around the time of opening of the Chilliwack Bypass, a bypass of Abbotsford was also being constructed. That section of freeway was officially opened by Phil Gaglardi on April 19, 1962. 

On May 1, 1964, the section of Freeway between what is now north of the 1st Avenue interchange to the Cape Horn Interchange opened. This was followed on June 12 by the opening of the Port Mann bridge, and the official opening of the freeway-expressway system from Bridal Falls to Taylor Way. A 90-year-old man and 11-year-old girl assisted Premier W.A.C. Bennett and Phil Gaglardi in opening the bridge. At the time of the bridge's opening, various speed limits were in effect. The section from Bridal Falls to the Port Mann Bridge had a  limit. Through Burnaby  was the limit.

New interchanges and upgrades
Over the years, various interchanges have been built and rebuilt.

On July 31, 1969, the interchange with Lickman Road in Chilliwack opened. The Prest Road overpass followed in the early 1970s.

In January 1992 the Cassiar Tunnel opened. The project replaced a surface street section of Cassiar Street which was used by traffic to get from the Burnaby Freeway to the Ironworkers Memorial Bridge.

Through the 2000s and 2010s multiple interchanges were upgraded and rebuilt along the highway. The Gateway program saw the rebuilding of several interchanges from Willingdon Avenue to 176 Street. Through Abbotsford the Mount Lehman/Fraser Highway, Clearbrook Road, and McCallum Road interchanges were rebuilt.

On June 9, 2011, Highway 1 between 152 Street in Surrey and Highway 11 in Abbotsford was designated as the Highway of Heroes.

On September 4, 2020, a new interchange with 216 Street was opened. 

On November 10, 2022, it was announced that major construction of a new overpass at Glover Road (which will be built first), a revised interchange with Highway 10/232 St. and widening to three lanes between 216 Street and Highway 13/264 St. had started. This work is part of a plan to eventually widen the highway to Whatcom Road in Abbotsford.

Interior section

Several sections of Highway 1 between Revelstoke and the Alberta border are under the jurisdiction of Parks Canada.

History 
Starting in 2004 the highway had a massive overhaul in the Kicking Horse Canyon near Golden including a 5 km realignment. 

During major floods in November 2021, sections of Highway 1 between Hope and Spences Bridge were washed away into the Thompson River. Other sections of the highway on Vancouver Island and a railroad underpass near Lytton were also damaged in the same event. As a result of the floods, which also damaged other highways in the Fraser Valley, road connections from Metro Vancouver to the rest of Canada were cut off.

Future

The Interior section of Highway 1 is considered sub-standard when compared to other highways with similar traffic volume in the U.S. or other parts of Canada. The majority of the route is a dangerous, undivided two-lane highway with sharp corners, prone to frequent closures and accidents. To address this, the Ministry of Transportation and Infrastructure has undertaken an effort to twin the highway to four-lane 100 km/h standards between Kamloops and Alberta, with a targeted completion date of 2050. Several stretches of four-lane divided highway, including the Monte Creek to Pritchard section; the four-lane portions of the Kicking Horse Canyon, the 13 km-long passing lanes near Blind Bay, and many smaller four-lane divided fragments typically 2–4 km in length, are the results of this effort. As of 2020, about 25 percent of the highway between Alberta and Kamloops has been upgraded to a divided four-lane cross-section. Several new projects have been funded and are expected to the constructed by 2023, including:

A new 4.9 km-long four-lane divided section around Chase, involving the construction of an interchange at the town;
A new interchange and twinned highway at the West entrance of Salmon Arm;
A new four-lane bridge across the Shuswap River in Sicamous;
A new rest area and a 2 km-long four-lane section in the Illecillewaet Valley;
A 4.4 km-long twinning near Quartz Creek east of Golden;
And upgrading the remaining 4 km-long stretch of two-lane highway in the Kicking Horse Canyon.

Major intersections

Notes

See also

 List of British Columbia provincial highways

References

External links

001
001
001
British Columbia 001
001
Transport in Abbotsford, British Columbia
Transport in Chilliwack
Transport in Kamloops
Transport in Nanaimo
1961 establishments in British Columbia